() is a death that is not a death of natural causes, such as a suicide, homicide, or an accident, which is an unjust death. For example, in Journey to the West: "Those people are the ghosts of the 64 places of smoke, the 72 places of grass, the princes and the chiefs, all of whom died in vain, and have no money and no control, and cannot be reborn, and are all lonely and hungry.". In the Travels of Lao Can: "I can go, but it is not useful to the business, but to add one more wrongful death in the cage."

Chinese people often set up temples for people who died in accidents, called Yin miao, hoping that after these people died in vain, they would be provided with jisi and not disturb the human world.

See also 

 Goryō
 Yin miao
 Chinese hero cult
 Heroic Martyrs Shrine
 Wrongful death claim

References 

Folklore studies
Cultural aspects of death
Causes of death